Stanislav Oliferchyk (born 9 May 1996) is a Ukrainian diver. He is a European champion and medalist in synchronized mixed diving with Viktoriya Kesar. In 2017 he won silver medal at the 2017 Summer Universiade.

References

Ukrainian male divers
1996 births
Sportspeople from Mariupol
Living people
Universiade medalists in diving
Universiade silver medalists for Ukraine
Medalists at the 2017 Summer Universiade
21st-century Ukrainian people